Mimacraea neokoton, the Mount Selinda acraea mimic, is a butterfly in the family Lycaenidae. It is found at Chirinda Forest near Mount Selinda in eastern Zimbabwe. The habitat consists of forests.

Adults are on wing from late February to early March.

The larvae feed on very dark, blue-green (black) algae (Cyanophyta).

References

Butterflies described in 1907
Poritiinae
Endemic fauna of Zimbabwe
Butterflies of Africa